The Alva B. Adams Tunnel is the principal component of the largest transmountain water project in Colorado, the Colorado-Big Thompson Project (C-BT). The tunnel transfers water from the western slope of the Colorado River drainage to the eastern Front Range of Colorado. The tunnel drops  in elevation along its length and runs in a straight line under the Continental Divide from west to east, passing under Rocky Mountain National Park. Construction began on 15 June 1940, but was suspended as a result of World War II priorities, from the end of 1942 to August 1943. The tunnel was holed through on 31 March 1944, an event that was broadcast throughout the United States by NBC Radio. The tunnel was posthumously named for its chief advocate, US Senator Alva B. Adams.

West of the Continental Divide, the input of the tunnel is water pumped from Windy Gap Reservoir, Willow Creek Reservoir and other North Fork of the Colorado River drainages to Lake Granby. From Lake Granby, the water is pumped into Shadow Mountain reservoir and then flows by gravity to Grand Lake, Colorado's largest natural body of water, from where it pours through the tunnel. Once the water reaches the Front Range on the eastern side of the Rocky Mountains, it is used to generate electricity as it falls almost half a mile (0.8 km) through five power plants on its way down the Front Range. To get the power from the Front Range power plants back to the pumps on the western slope, a  diameter watertight nitrogen-filled conduit carrying a 69,000 volt electric power transmission line is mounted on the roof of the tunnel. This power is used to run the pumps on the western side of the tunnel, while surplus power is sold. West slope water is stored on the Front Range in Mary's Lake, Lake Estes, Carter Lake (all reservoirs), Flatiron Reservoir, Horsetooth Reservoir and Boulder Reservoir for power generation or release after the peak snow melt months of May to July.

Entrance (West Portal, Underwater) 
Exit (East Portal)

References

Water tunnels in the United States
Transportation buildings and structures in Grand County, Colorado
Transportation buildings and structures in Larimer County, Colorado
Buildings and structures in Rocky Mountain National Park
Tunnels completed in 1947
1947 establishments in Colorado